The Proud Rider (also known as The Last Ride) is a Canadian outlaw biker film released in 1971.

Inspired in part by Easy Rider, it stars Michael Bell, Scott Colomby, and (in his screen debut) Art Hindle.

Filmed in and around Courtice, Ontario, the bikers (as in other biker films of the era, including Angels Hard as They Come) were played by actual members of Satan's Choice.

Notes

Sources 
 "The Proud Rider" at Letterboxd.com
 "The Proud Rider" at IMDb.com
 "The Proud Rider" at TCM.com
 "The Proud Rider" at Bikermovies411.com

English-language Canadian films
Films about drugs
Films set in Ontario
Films shot in Ontario
Hippie films
Motorcycling films
Canadian drama road movies
1971 drama films
1971 films
Outlaw biker films
1970s drama road movies
1970s English-language films
1970s Canadian films